Volleyball at the 2008 Summer Paralympics was held in the China Agricultural University Gymnasium from 7 September to 15 September. Two sitting volleyball team events were held, one for men and one for women.

In the men's sitting event, Bosnia and Herzegovina were the defending champions. Bosnia and Herzegovina and Iran had been the finalists in both 2000 and 2004, with Iran winning in 2000 and Bosnia and Herzegovina in 2004. These two countries met once more in the final in Beijing, with Iran emerging victorious by 3 goals to nil. Egypt, the bronze medal-winners of 2008, finished fourth, beaten 2:3 by Russia, who took bronze.

The Beijing Games marked the second time the women's sitting event was held. China were the defending champions, while the Netherlands had taken silver, and the United States bronze, in 2004. In Beijing, China was again victorious, while the United States and the Netherlands switched places to ascend the podium with silver and bronze, respectively.

This was the second Summer Paralympic Games without standing volleyball events, which had been included from the introduction of volleyball in 1976 (when sitting volleyball was a demonstration event) through 2000.

Medalists

Classification
Classification is an important work for Paralympic athletes, after the classification, athletes can compete in a fair situation.
Athletes meeting the disability requirement can take part in this sport, but only 2 minimum requirements player can be on the team, and only 1 of them can be on the court.

Qualification
There were 16 teams, 8 male and 8 female taking part in this sport.

Teams

Men

Women

Men's tournament

Preliminary round

Group A

Group B

Final Round

Semifinals

Bronze medal match

Gold medal match

5-8 Classification

Women's tournament

Preliminary round

Group A

Group B

Final Round

Semifinals

Bronze medal match

Gold medal match

5-8th Classification

References

External links 
 Official Site of the 2008 Summer Paralympics

2008
2008 Summer Paralympics events
Paralympics